Lactifluus edulis is a species of agaric fungus in the family Russulaceae. Described as new to science in 1994, it is found in Burundi.

See also
List of Lactifluus species

References

External links

Fungi described in 1994
Fungi of Africa
edulis